Effie Crockett (4 March 1856 – January 7, 1940), also known as Effie I. Canning, also known as Effie C. Carlton, was an American actress. She is credited with having written and composed the lullaby "Rock-a-bye Baby"; despite the words being in print in 1765.

Life
Effie I. Crockett, daughter of Edward and Jennie Crockett, was born 4 March 1856 in Rockland, Knox, Maine, and died 7 January 1940 in Waltham, Middlesex County, Massachusetts. She was married firstly on 30 July 1881 in Boston, Suffolk, Massachusetts to John F. Canning, a physician, son of John and Mary Canning, born c.1843 in Saint John, New Brunswick, Canada, and died 22 June 1888 in Boston, Suffolk, Massachusetts. She married secondly in c.1894 to Harry J. Carlton born c.July 1859 in Boston, Suffolk, Massachusetts, and died 21 January 1922 in Boston, Suffolk, Massachusetts.

The words of "Rock-a-bye Baby" first appeared in print in Mother Goose's Melody (London, c. 1765), possibly published by John Newbery (1713–1767), and which was reprinted in Boston in 1785. Rock-a-bye as a phrase was first recorded in 1805 in Benjamin Tabart's Songs for the Nursery, (London, 1805).

By one account she created the song in 1872 while minding someone else's baby. Her tune was spotted by her banjo teacher and he sent her to have it published in Boston. Because of "Rock-a-bye Baby", she is credited in over 100 films, many made decades after her death.

"Rock-a-Bye, Baby" is said to have been composed by Effie Crockett Canning in 1886. Her waltz-lullaby has been sung by millions of parents. She says that she used her grandmother's surname of Canning when publishing the work as she was unsure of her father's reaction to her work.

On stage, Canning appeared opposite William Gillette in his adaption of The Private Secretary. She toured in Charles Frohman's production of Oliver Twist, played with Mrs. Leslie Carter's company, and later had her own repertory company.

Effie I. (Crockett) Canning Carlton and her second husband Harry J. Carlton are buried at Mt. Feake Cemetery, Waltham, Massachusetts.

References

External links

1856 births
1940 deaths
American women songwriters
Songwriters from Maine
American stage actresses